The 1976 Hang Ten 400 was an endurance race for Group C Touring Cars. The event was staged at the Sandown circuit in Victoria, Australia on 12 September 1976 over 130 laps of the 3.11 km circuit, a total of 403.8 km. The event was Round 8 of the 1976 Australian Touring Car Championship and Round 1 of the 1976 Australian Championship of Makes. It was the eleventh running of the endurance race which would later become known as the Sandown 500.

The race was won by Peter Brock driving a Holden Torana.

Results

Note: 53 cars are listed on the grid list published with the Hang Ten 400 race report in Racing Car News magazine.

References

 The Australian Racing History of Ford, © 1989
 The Official Racing History of Holden, © 1988

External links

Motorsport at Sandown
Hang Ten 500
Pre-Bathurst 500